Kirill Smirnov (Russian: Кирилл Смирнов, born 2 April 1996) is a Russian Paralympic archer. He won a gold medal in the mixed team recurve event at the 2020 Summer Paralympics, and placed fifth individually. He won another gold medal in the team recurve at the 2017 World Championships.

When he was 10 years old, Smirnov fell off a truck and lost his left leg. He first trained in equestrian before changing to archery in 2010.

References

External links 
 

1996 births
Living people
Russian male archers
Paralympic archers of Russia
Paralympic medalists in archery
Paralympic gold medalists for the Russian Paralympic Committee athletes
Archers at the 2020 Summer Paralympics
Medalists at the 2020 Summer Paralympics
21st-century Russian people